David Andrew Hagan (born 25 June 1966) is an English former cricketer.

Hagan was born in June 1966 at Wideopen, Northumberland. He later studied at St Edmund Hall, Oxford. While studying at Oxford, he made his debut in first-class cricket for Oxford University against Worcestershire at Oxford in 1985. He played first-class cricket for Oxford until 1991, making forty appearances. Playing as a batsman, Hagan scored 1,212 runs at an average of 20.54 and a high score of 88, which was one of four half centuries he made. He also made a first-class appearance for a combined Oxford and Cambridge Universities cricket team against the touring New Zealanders in 1986. In addition to playing first-class cricket while at Oxford, he also made two List A one-day appearances for the Combined Universities cricket team in the 1986 Benson & Hedges Cup.

References

External links

1966 births
Living people
People from Northumberland (before 1974)
Alumni of St Edmund Hall, Oxford
English cricketers
Oxford University cricketers
British Universities cricketers
Cricketers from Tyne and Wear